No. 15 Squadron is a fighter squadron of the Indian Air Force. It was formed on 20 August 1951, and currently operates the Sukhoi Su-30MKI from Sirsa AFS.

Assignments 
 Indo-Pakistani War of 1965
Indo-Pakistani War of 1971

Aircraft

Aircraft types operated by the squadron

References

015